Cloe Isabella Mackie and Holly Elizabeth Mackie ( also known as Cloi Mckee and Holli Mckee; born ) are British twin actresses, best known for playing Tania and Tara, respectively, in the 2007 and 2009 St Trinian's films.

Filmography

Cloe Mackie
Home Grown (2006) short film -Zoe
Wednesday (2006) short film - young Lilya
Death Defying Acts (2007) feature Film - Psychic Twin One 
St Trinian's (2007) feature film - Tania 
St. Trinian's II: The Legend of Fritton's Gold (2009) feature Film - Tania 
The Coven (2015) feature film - Cara

Holly Mackie
Home Grown (2006) short film - Zoe
Death Defying Acts (2007) feature film - Psychic Twin Two  
St Trinian's (2007) feature film - Tara 
St. Trinian's II: The Legend of Fritton's Gold (2009) feature film - Tara 
The Coven (2015)- feature film - Ruby

References

External links

1997 births
Living people
English child actresses
English twins
Actresses from London